The Netherlands participated at the Eurovision Song Contest 1988, held in Dublin, Ireland.

Before Eurovision

Nationaal Songfestival 1988 
The final was held on 23 March 1988 at the Congresgebouw in The Hague, hosted by Astrid Joosten. All songs were performed by Gerard Joling, who was internally selected by Dutch broadcaster Nederlandse Omroep Stichting (NOS) to sing for the Netherlands at the 1988 contest in Dublin, with the winning song being chosen by a 55-member jury who gave each song a mark out of 6.

At Eurovision
Joling performed 7th on the night of the contest, following Spain and preceding Israel. His song received 70 points, placing 9th of 22 competing countries.

The Dutch conductor at the contest was Harry van Hoof.

Among the members of the Dutch jury were Hans van den Berg and Bert Tuk.

Voting

References

External links
 Dutch National Final 1988 page

1988
Countries in the Eurovision Song Contest 1988
Eurovision